Regal Theater or Regal Theatre may refer to:

 Regal Theater, Chicago
 New Regal Theater, Chicago
 Regal Theatre, New Delhi, India
 Regal Theatre, Perth, Western Australia
 Regal Theatre, Adelaide, South Australia

See also
 Regal Entertainment Group
 Regal Cinema (disambiguation)
 Regal (disambiguation)